Expedition 36 was the 36th long-duration mission to the International Space Station.

Crew

Sources
NASA

Mission
On 2013 June 16, the 50th anniversary of Vostok 6, the first spaceshot by a woman, Valentina Tereshkova, Karen L. Nyberg was one of two women in space, the other being Wang Yaping aboard Tiangong-1 on the Shenzhou 10 mission.

On 2013 July 16, during EVA-23, Luca Parmitano reported that water was steadily leaking into his helmet. Flight controllers elected to abort the EVA immediately, and Parmitano made his way back to the Quest airlock, followed by Chris Cassidy, with whom he was performing the EVA. The airlock began re-pressurizing after a 1-hour and 32 minute spacewalk, and by this time Parmitano was having difficulty seeing, hearing, and speaking due to the amount of water in his suit. After re-pressurization, commander Pavel Vinogradov and crew member Fyodor Yurchikhin quickly removed Parmitano's helmet and soaked up the water with towels. Despite the incident, Parmitano was reported to be in good spirits and suffered no injury.

References

External links

 NASA's Space Station Expeditions page
 
 

Expeditions to the International Space Station
2013 in spaceflight